Jonathan Robinson (November 18, 1894 – October 11, 1948) was a Canadian lawyer and provincial politician.

He was born in Waterloo, Quebec and was the grandson of Asa Belknap Foster. In 1928, he married Florence Walker McMaster, daughter of Andrew Ross McMaster. He studied law at McGill University and was admitted to the Bar of Quebec in 1938.  He served as secretary of the Bar of Montreal in 1932 and 1933.

Robinson was a member of the Legislative Assembly of Quebec for the Union Nationale for Brome from 1936 until his death in 1948. He was Minister of Mines from 1944 until his death and was the representative of English-speaking Quebecers in the provincial cabinet.

References

1894 births
1948 deaths
People from Montérégie
Union Nationale (Quebec) MNAs
Canadian military personnel of World War I